Forschen und Schaffen. Folge VI is an East German film. It was released in 1954.

External links
 

1954 films
East German films
1950s German-language films
1950s German films